Whip Run is a stream in the U.S. state of West Virginia.

Whip Run most likely was named after the local Whip (or Whipp) family.

See also
List of rivers of West Virginia

References

Rivers of Grant County, West Virginia
Rivers of Mineral County, West Virginia
Rivers of West Virginia